La Rochelle – Île de Ré Airport  is an international airport located in the city of La Rochelle, in the Charente-Maritime department, France. The airport also serves Île de Ré, which is accessible via a bridge from La Rochelle.

Airlines and destinations 
The following airlines operate regular scheduled and charter flights at La Rochelle – Île de Ré Airport:

Traffic and statistics 

La Rochelle Airport welcomed 240 154 passengers in 2018, an increase of 8.4% compared to 2017.

References

External links 

La Rochelle – Île de Ré Airport (official site)
Aéroport de La Rochelle – Ile de Ré (Union des Aéroports Français) 

Airports in Nouvelle-Aquitaine
Airports established in 1934
1934 establishments in France